Arcona may refer to:

Cape Arkona, a cape on the island of Rügen, Germany
Arcona, an alien race in Star Wars
Cap Arcona, a German ship sunk in 1945
 SMS Arcona, three ships of the German navies 

it:Popoli di Guerre stellari#Arcona